Thief Takers is a British television crime drama series, created by Roy Mitchell, and produced by Central Independent Television for the ITV network. The series depicts the work of a team of officers based in the Metropolitan Police Service's Flying Squad, which Reece Dinsdale, Brendan Coyle, Grant Masters and Nicholas Ball appearing in the principal roles. The series was Carlton's attempt to rival Thames Television's The Bill, after the producer unexpectedly retained the series despite a major take-over by Carlton. A total of three series were broadcast between 1 February 1995 and 18 December 1997, with a total of twenty-five episodes broadcast. Each episode features a stand-alone case, with the exception of a small number of two-part episodes. However, the personal lives of each of the officers in the team provide the backdrop for a continuing story arc throughout all three series.

Reception for the third and final series was mixed, and a major shake-up in the main cast was cited as the main reason for declining viewing figures. Subsequently, the series was axed in 1998 shortly before a fourth series was set to go into production. All three series, plus the pilot episode, were released on VHS on 26 January 2000. An official book, entitled "The Inside Story", written by Geoff Tibballs, was also published to coincide with the first series. An official novelisation, written by Lee O'Keefe, was also published on 11 January 1996. Notably, the series has yet to be released on DVD.

Cast
 Reece Dinsdale as DI Charlie Scott (Series 1–2)
 Grant Masters as DI Glenn Mateo (Series 3)
 Brendan Coyle as DS Bob 'Bingo' Tate (Series 1–2)
 Lynda Steadman as DS Helen Ash (Series 1)
 Amanda Pays as DS Anna Dryden (Series 2–3)
 Robert Willox as DC Ted Donachie (Series 1–3)
 Gary McDonald as DC Alan Oxford (Series 1–3)
 Pooky Quesnel as DC Grace Harris (Series 1–2)
 Simone Lahbib as DC Lucy McCarthy (Series 3)
 David Sterne as DCI Frank Utley (Series 1–3)
 Nicholas Ball as DCI Nick Hall (Series 3)
 Robert Reynolds as DI Micky Dawes (Pilot)
 Lennie James as DC Alan Oxford (Pilot)
 Sophie Dix as DC Angela Prudhoe (Pilot)

Episodes

Pilot (1995)

Series 1 (1996)

Series 2 (1996)

Series 3 (1997)

See also
 Thief-taker

References

External links

 Thief Takers entry at the British Film Institute

1995 British television series debuts
1997 British television series endings
1990s British crime television series
British crime drama television series
English-language television shows
ITV television dramas
Television series by ITV Studios
Television shows set in London
Television shows produced by Central Independent Television